Bis(dicyclohexylphosphino)ethane, abbreviated dcpe, is an organophosphorus compound with the formula (C6H11)2PCH2CH2P(C6H11)2.  It is a white solid that is soluble in nonpolar organic solvents.  The compound is used as a bulky and highly basic diphosphine ligand in coordination chemistry.

References

Chelating agents
Diphosphines
1,2-Ethanediyl compounds